Sajjida Bibi Shah (born 25 June 1988) is a Pakistani former cricketer who played as an all-rounder, batting right-handed and bowling right-arm off break. She appeared in two Test matches, 60 One Day Internationals and eight Twenty20 Internationals for Pakistan between 2000 and 2010. She played domestic cricket for Hyderabad, Balochistan, Sindh and Zarai Taraqiati Bank Limited.

Playing career
Sajjida Shah made her debut for Pakistan in a One-Day International against Ireland on 23 July 2000 when aged just twelve. She played four ODIs on that tour, and also played her first Test match, in what is Ireland's only women's Test to date.

In 2001, she played seven ODIs against the Netherlands in Karachi and in 2002 played six ODIs against Sri Lanka in Sri Lanka, before what is perhaps the finest moment of her career to date happened in 2003.

At the 2003 IWCC Trophy in the Netherlands, she played in all five of Pakistan's matches. In the opening match against Japan, she tore through the Japanese batting line-up, taking seven wickets for just four runs. This was the best bowling performance in the tournament and remains the best innings bowling performance in the history of women's ODI cricket. She took twelve wickets overall and was the tournament's top wicket-taker. She is also the youngest Woman cricketer to take a five wicket haul in Women's ODI history(at the age of 15 years and 168 days)

The following year, the West Indies toured Pakistan and Shah played in seven ODIs and a Test match against them. The Test is her (and Pakistan's) last Test match to date. Since then, she has played in two Asia Cup tournaments and five ODIs against South Africa.

References

External links
 
 

1988 births
Living people
People from Hyderabad, Sindh
Pakistani women cricketers
Pakistan women Test cricketers
Pakistan women One Day International cricketers
Pakistan women Twenty20 International cricketers
Hyderabad (Pakistan) women cricketers
Baluchistan women cricketers
Sindh women cricketers
Zarai Taraqiati Bank Limited women cricketers